Kamy Keshmiri (born January 23, 1969) is a retired male discus thrower from the United States. He is best known for winning the gold medal in the men's discus throw event at the 1989 Summer Universiade in Duisburg, West Germany. Keshmiri set his personal best (51.28 metres) at the 1988 World Junior Championships in Athletics in Sudbury, Ontario on July 27, 1988. He also won three NCAA discus titles at the University of Nevada at Reno.

His father, Jalal, was born in Iran and represented Iran in the 1968 Olympics.

When he was at Reno High School, he set the National High School Record in the Discus Throw.  He was Gatorade High School Track and Field Athlete of the Year and Track and Field News "High School Athlete of the Year" in 1987.

Keshmiri was one of the only American Olympic athletes to have their medal taken away after he was found with illegal steroids in his system.

Achievements

In 1992, the International Amateur Athletic Federation banned Keshmiri after a positive test for methanolone.

References

External links

I.A.A.F. Takes Discus Away From Keshmiri

1969 births
Living people
American male discus throwers
American people of Iranian descent
Doping cases in athletics
Universiade medalists in athletics (track and field)
Goodwill Games medalists in athletics
Universiade gold medalists for the United States
Medalists at the 1989 Summer Universiade
Competitors at the 1990 Goodwill Games